Fritz Metzger (1898–1973) was a Swiss church architect.

External links
 structurae.de
 openlibrary.org

Swiss architects
1898 births
1973 deaths